The Battle of Colorno consisted of two battles, fought between 25 May and 5 June 1734, between Franco-Sardinian and Austrian (Habsburg) troops as part of the War of Polish Succession.

Begun on 25 May 1734, the Imperial Austro-German armies conquered and occupied Colorno and its palace during the decisive attack of 1 June. 
During the second battle of 4-5 June the Franco-Piedmontese drove them out of Colorno again, forcing them to withdraw. 

These events were part of the Polish War of Succession and were the prelude of the larger Battle of San Pietro, which took place in the Valera Campaign, outside the walls of Parma, on 29 June 1734.

References 
Report containing all that has happened of most importance in Italy, on the Rhine, in Poland, and in most of the courts of Europe. By Mr. P. Massuet
Battaglia di Colorno - 4 giugno 1734 - Francesco Simonini

Colorno
Colorno
Colorno
Colorno
Conflicts in 1734
1734 in Austria
1734 in France
History of Parma
1734 in Italy